Vilamarxant is a municipality in the comarca of Camp de Túria in the Valencian Community, Spain.

Notable people 
Raúl Albiol, (born 4 September 1985) is a Spanish professional footballer who plays for Spanish club Villareal CF and the Spanish national team.
Miguel Albiol (born 2 September 1981) is a Spanish professional footballer

References

Municipalities in Camp de Túria
Populated places in Camp de Túria